

Events

Pre-1600
141 BC – Liu Che, posthumously known as Emperor Wu of Han, assumes the throne over the Han dynasty of China.
1009 – First known mention of Lithuania, in the annals of the monastery of Quedlinburg.
1226 – Khwarazmian sultan Jalal ad-Din conquers the Georgian capital of Tbilisi.
1230 – Bulgarian Tsar Ivan Asen II defeats Theodore of Epirus in the Battle of Klokotnitsa.
1500 – The fleet of Pedro Álvares Cabral leaves Lisbon for the Indies. The fleet will discover Brazil which lies within boundaries granted to Portugal in the Treaty of Tordesillas in 1494.

1601–1900
1701 – Safavid troops retreat from Basra, ending a three-year occupation.
1765 – After a campaign by the writer Voltaire, judges in Paris posthumously exonerate Jean Calas of murdering his son. Calas had been tortured and executed in 1762 on the charge, though his son may have actually died by suicide.
1776 – The Wealth of Nations by Scottish economist and philosopher Adam Smith is published.
1796 – Napoléon Bonaparte marries his first wife, Joséphine de Beauharnais.
1811 – Paraguayan forces defeat Manuel Belgrano at the Battle of Tacuarí.
1815 – Francis Ronalds describes the first battery-operated clock in the Philosophical Magazine.
1841 – The U.S. Supreme Court rules in the United States v. The Amistad case that captive Africans who had seized control of the ship carrying them had been taken into slavery illegally.
1842 – Giuseppe Verdi's third opera, Nabucco, receives its première performance in Milan; its success establishes Verdi as one of Italy's foremost opera composers.
  1842   – The first documented discovery of gold in California occurs at Rancho San Francisco, six years before the California Gold Rush.
1847 – Mexican–American War: The first large-scale amphibious assault in U.S. history is launched in the Siege of Veracruz.

1901–present
1908 – Inter Milan was founded on Football Club Internazionale, following a schism from A.C. Milan.
1916 – Mexican Revolution: Pancho Villa leads nearly 500 Mexican raiders in an attack against the border town of Columbus, New Mexico.
1933 – Great Depression: President Franklin D. Roosevelt submits the Emergency Banking Act to Congress, the first of his New Deal policies.
1942 – World War II: Dutch East Indies unconditionally surrendered to the Japanese forces in Kalijati, Subang, West Java, and the Japanese completed their Dutch East Indies campaign.
1944 – World War II: Soviet Army planes attack Tallinn, Estonia.
1945 – World War II: A coup d'état by Japanese forces in French Indochina removes the French from power.
  1945   – World War II: Allied forces carry out firebombing over Tokyo, destroying most of the capital and killing over 100,000 civilians.
1946 – Bolton Wanderers stadium disaster at Burnden Park, Bolton, England, kills 33 and injures hundreds more.
1954 – McCarthyism: CBS television broadcasts the See It Now episode, "A Report on Senator Joseph McCarthy", produced by Fred Friendly.
1956 – Soviet forces suppress mass demonstrations in the Georgian SSR, reacting to Nikita Khrushchev's de-Stalinization policy.
1957 – The 8.6  Andreanof Islands earthquake shakes the Aleutian Islands, causing over $5 million in damage from ground movement and a destructive tsunami.
1959 – The Barbie doll makes its debut at the American International Toy Fair in New York.
1960 – Dr. Belding Hibbard Scribner implants for the first time a shunt he invented into a patient, which allows the patient to receive hemodialysis on a regular basis.
1961 – Sputnik 9 successfully launches, carrying a dog and a human dummy, and demonstrating that the Soviet Union was ready to begin human spaceflight.
1967 – Trans World Airlines Flight 553 crashes in a field in Concord Township, Ohio, following a mid-air collision with a Beechcraft Baron, killing 26 people.
1974 – The Mars 7 Flyby bus releases the descent module too early, missing Mars.
1976 – Forty-two people die in the Cavalese cable car disaster, the worst cable-car accident to date.
1977 – The Hanafi Siege: In a 39-hour standoff, armed Hanafi Muslims seize three Washington, D.C., buildings.
1978 – President Soeharto inaugurated Jagorawi Toll Road, the first toll highway in Indonesia, connecting Jakarta, Bogor and Ciawi, West Java.
1987 – Chrysler announces its acquisition of American Motors Corporation
1997 – Comet Hale–Bopp: Observers in China, Mongolia and eastern Siberia are treated to a rare double feature as an eclipse permits Hale-Bopp to be seen during the day.
  1997   – The Notorious B.I.G. is murdered in Los Angeles after attending the Soul Train Music Awards. He is gunned down leaving an after party at the Petersen Automotive Museum. His murder remains unsolved.
2011 – Space Shuttle Discovery makes its final landing after 39 flights.
2012 – A truce between the Salvadoran government and gangs in the country goes into effect when 30 gang leaders are transferred to lower security prisons.

Births

Pre-1600
1451 – Amerigo Vespucci, Italian cartographer and explorer, namesake of the Americas (d. 1512)
1564 – David Fabricius, German theologian, cartographer and astronomer (d. 1617)
1568 – Aloysius Gonzaga, Italian saint, namesake of Gonzaga University (d. 1591)

1601–1900
1662 – Franz Anton von Sporck, German noble (d. 1738)
1697 – Friederike Caroline Neuber, German actress (d. 1760)
1737 – Josef Mysliveček, Czech violinist and composer (d. 1781)
1749 – Honoré Gabriel Riqueti, comte de Mirabeau, French journalist and politician (d. 1791)
1753 – Jean-Baptiste Kléber, French general (d. 1800)
1758 – Franz Joseph Gall, German neuroanatomist and physiologist (d. 1828)
1763 – William Cobbett, English journalist and author (d. 1835)
1806 – Edwin Forrest, American actor and philanthropist (d. 1872)
1814 – Taras Shevchenko, Ukrainian poet and playwright (d. 1861)
1815 – David Davis, American jurist and politician (d. 1886)
1820 – Samuel Blatchford, American lawyer and jurist (d. 1893)
1824 – Amasa Leland Stanford, American businessman and politician, founded Stanford University (d. 1893)
1847 – Martin Pierre Marsick, Belgian violinist, composer, and educator (d. 1924)
1850 – Hamo Thornycroft, English sculptor and academic (d. 1925)
1856 – Eddie Foy, Sr., American actor and dancer (d. 1928)
1863 – Mary Harris Armor, American suffragist (d. 1950)
1887 – Fritz Lenz, German geneticist and physician (d. 1976)
1890 – Rupert Balfe, Australian footballer and lieutenant (d. 1915)
  1890   – Vyacheslav Molotov, Russian politician and diplomat, Soviet Minister of Foreign Affairs (d. 1986)
1891 – José P. Laurel, Filipino lawyer, politician and President of the Philippines (d. 1959)
1892 – Mátyás Rákosi, Hungarian politician (d. 1971)
  1892   – Vita Sackville-West, English author, poet, and gardener (d. 1962)

1901–present
1902 – Will Geer, American actor (d. 1978)
1904 – Paul Wilbur Klipsch, American soldier and engineer, founded Klipsch Audio Technologies (d. 2002)
1910 – Samuel Barber, American pianist and composer (d. 1981)
1911 – Clara Rockmore, American classical violin prodigy and theremin player, (d. 1998)
1915 – Johnnie Johnson, English air marshal and pilot (d. 2001)
1918 – George Lincoln Rockwell, American sailor and politician, founded the American Nazi Party (d. 1967)
  1918   – Mickey Spillane, American crime novelist (d. 2006)
1920 – Franjo Mihalić, Croatian-Serbian runner and coach (d. 2015)
1921 – Carl Betz, American actor (d. 1978)
1922 – Ian Turbott, New Zealand-Australian former diplomat and university administrator (d. 2016)
1923 – James L. Buckley, American lawyer, judge, and politician
  1923   – André Courrèges, French fashion designer (d. 2016)
  1923   – Walter Kohn, Austrian-American physicist and academic, Nobel Prize laureate (d. 2016)
1926 – Joe Franklin, American radio and television host (d. 2015)
1928 – Gerald Bull, Canadian-American engineer and academic (d. 1990)
  1928   – Keely Smith, American singer and actress (d. 2017)
1929 – Desmond Hoyte, Guyanese lawyer, politician and President of Guyana (d. 2002)
  1929   – Zillur Rahman, Bangladeshi politician, 19th President of Bangladesh (d. 2013)
1930 – Ornette Coleman, American saxophonist, violinist, trumpet player, and composer (d. 2015)
1931 – Jackie Healy-Rae, Irish politician (d. 2014)
1932 – Qayyum Chowdhury, Bangladeshi painter and academic (d. 2014)
  1932   – Walter Mercado, Puerto Rican-American astrologer and actor (d. 2019)
1933 – Lloyd Price, American R&B singer-songwriter (d. 2021)
  1933   – David Weatherall, English physician, geneticist, and academic (d. 2018)
1934 – Yuri Gagarin, Russian colonel, pilot, and cosmonaut, first human in space (d. 1968)
  1934   – Joyce Van Patten, American actress
1935 – Andrew Viterbi, American engineer and businessman, co-founded Qualcomm Inc.
1936 – Mickey Gilley, American singer-songwriter and pianist (d. 2022)
  1936   – Marty Ingels, American actor and comedian (d. 2015)
1937 – Bernard Landry, Canadian lawyer, politician and Premier of Quebec (d. 2018)
  1937   – Harry Neale, Canadian ice hockey player, coach, and sportscaster
  1937   – Brian Redman, English race car driver
1940 – Raul Julia, Puerto Rican-American actor (d. 1994)
1941 – Jim Colbert, American golfer
  1941   – Ernesto Miranda, American criminal (d. 1976)
1942 – John Cale, Welsh musician, composer, singer, songwriter and record producer
  1942   – Ion Caramitru, Romanian actor and artistic director (d. 2021)
  1942   – Mark Lindsay, American singer-songwriter, saxophonist, and producer
1943 – Bobby Fischer, American chess player and author (d. 2008)
1944 – Lee Irvine, South African cricketer
1945 – Robert Calvert, English singer-songwriter and playwright (d. 1988)
  1945   – Robin Trower, English rock guitarist and vocalist
  1945   – Dennis Rader (The BTK strangler) American serial killer.
1946 – Alexandra Bastedo, English actress (d. 2014)
  1946   – Warren Skaaren, American screenwriter and producer (d. 1990)
  1946   – Bernd Hölzenbein, German footballer and scout
1947 – Keri Hulme, New Zealand author and poet (d. 2021)
1948 – Emma Bonino, Italian politician, Italian Minister of Foreign Affairs
  1948   – Eric Fischl, American painter and sculptor
  1948   – Jeffrey Osborne, American singer and drummer
1949 – Neil Hamilton, Welsh lawyer and politician
1950 – Doug Ault, American baseball player and manager (d. 2004)
  1950   – Andy North, American golfer
  1950   – Howard Shelley, English pianist and conductor
1951 – Helen Zille, South African journalist, politician and Premier of the Western Cape
1952 – Bill Beaumont, English rugby player and manager
1954 – Carlos Ghosn, Brazilian-Lebanese-French business executive
  1954   – Bobby Sands, PIRA volunteer; Irish republican politician (d. 1981)
  1954   – Jock Taylor, Scottish motorcycle racer (d. 1982)
1955 – Teo Fabi, Italian race car driver
  1955   – Józef Pinior, Polish academic and politician
1956 – Mark Dantonio, American football player and coach
  1956   – Shashi Tharoor, Indian politician, Indian Minister of External Affairs
  1956   – David Willetts, English academic and politician
1958 – Linda Fiorentino, American actress
  1958   – Paul MacLean, Canadian ice hockey player and coach
1959 – Takaaki Kajita, Japanese physicist and academic, Nobel Prize laureate
  1959   – Lonny Price, American actor, director, and screenwriter
1960 – Finn Carter, American actress 
  1960   – Željko Obradović, Serbian basketball player and coach
1961 – Rick Steiner, American wrestler
  1961   – Darrell Walker, American basketball player and coach
1963 – Terry Mulholland, American baseball player
  1963   – Jean-Marc Vallée, Canadian director and screenwriter (d. 2021)
1964 – Juliette Binoche, French actress
  1964   – Phil Housley, American ice hockey player and coach
1965 – Brian Bosworth, American football player and actor
  1965   – Benito Santiago, Puerto Rican-American baseball player
1966 – Brendan Canty, American drummer and songwriter
  1966   – Tony Lockett, Australian footballer
1968 – Youri Djorkaeff, French footballer
1969 – Kimberly Guilfoyle, American lawyer and journalist
1970 – Naveen Jindal, Indian businessman and politician
  1970   – Martin Johnson, English rugby player and coach
1971 – Emmanuel Lewis, American actor 
1972 – Jodey Arrington, American politician
1973 – Aaron Boone, American baseball player and manager
  1973   – Liam Griffin, English race car driver
1975 – Juan Sebastián Verón, Argentinian footballer
1977 – Radek Dvořák, Czech ice hockey player
  1977   – Mark Tookey, Australian rugby league player
1979 – Oscar Isaac, Guatemalan-American actor
1980 – Howard Bailey Jr. (Chingy), American rapper
  1980   – Matthew Gray Gubler, American actor.
1981 – Antonio Bryant, American football player
  1981   – Clay Rapada, American baseball player
1982 – Ryan Bayley, Australian cyclist
  1982   – Matt Bowen, Australian rugby league player
  1982   – Mirjana Lučić-Baroni, Croatian tennis player
1983 – Wayne Simien, American basketball player
  1983   – Clint Dempsey, American international soccer player
1984 – Abdoulay Konko, French footballer
  1984   – Julia Mancuso, American skier
1985 – Brent Burns, Canadian ice hockey player
  1985   – Jesse Litsch, American baseball player
  1985   – Pastor Maldonado, Venezuelan race car driver
  1985   – Parthiv Patel, Indian cricketer
1986 – Colin Greening, Canadian ice hockey player
  1986   – Brittany Snow, American actress and producer
1987 – Shad Moss (Bow Wow), American rapper and actor
1989 – Kim Tae-yeon (Taeyeon), South Korean singer
1990 – Daley Blind, Dutch footballer
  1990   – Matt Robinson, New Zealand rugby league player
  1990   – Keenon Dequan Ray Jackson (YG), American rapper
1991 – Kim Joo-young (Jooyoung), South Korean singer-songwriter
1993 – Min Yoon-gi (Suga), South Korean rapper, songwriter, record producer
1994 – Morgan Rielly, Canadian ice hockey player
1995 – Cierra Ramirez, American actress and singer
1997 – Jane Chika Oranika (Chika), American rapper
1998 – Najee Harris, American football running back
2000 – Khabane Lame (Khaby Lame), Senegalese-Italian social media personality

Deaths

Pre-1600
 886 – Abu Ma'shar al-Balkhi, Muslim scholar and astrologer (b. 787)
1202 – Sverre of Norway, king of Norway and founder of the House of Sverre
1440 – Frances of Rome, Italian nun and saint (b. 1384)
1444 – Leonardo Bruni, Italian humanist (b. c.1370)
1463 – Catherine of Bologna, Italian nun and saint (d. 1463)
1566 – David Rizzio, Italian-Scottish courtier and politician (b. 1533).

1601–1900
1649 – James Hamilton, 1st Duke of Hamilton, Scottish soldier and politician, (b. 1606)
  1649   – Henry Rich, 1st Earl of Holland, English soldier and politician (b. 1590)
1661 – Cardinal Mazarin, Italian-French academic and politician, Prime Minister of France (b. 1602)
1709 – Ralph Montagu, 1st Duke of Montagu, English courtier and politician (b. 1638)
1808 – Joseph Bonomi the Elder, Italian architect (b. 1739)
1810 – Ozias Humphry, English painter and academic (b. 1742)
1825 – Anna Laetitia Barbauld, English poet, author, and critic (b. 1743)
1831 – Friedrich Maximilian von Klinger, German author and playwright (b. 1752)
1847 – Mary Anning, English paleontologist (b. 1799)
1851 – Hans Christian Ørsted, Danish physicist and chemist, discovered electromagnetism and the element aluminium (b. 1777)
1876 – Louise Colet, French poet (b. 1810)
1888 – William I, German Emperor (b. 1797)
1895 – Leopold von Sacher-Masoch, Austrian journalist and author (b. 1836)
1897 – Sondre Norheim, Norwegian-American skier (b. 1825)

1901–present
1918 – Frank Wedekind, German author and playwright (b. 1864)
1925 – Willard Metcalf, American painter and academic (b. 1858)
1926 – Mikao Usui, Japanese spiritual leader, founded Reiki (b. 1865)
1937 – Paul Elmer More, American journalist and critic (b. 1864)
1943 – Otto Freundlich, German painter and sculptor (b. 1878)
1954 – Vagn Walfrid Ekman, Swedish oceanographer and academic (b. 1874)
1955 – Miroslava Stern (Miroslava), Czech-Mexican actress (b. 1925)
1964 – Paul von Lettow-Vorbeck, German general (b. 1870)
1969 – Abdul Munim Riad, Egyptian general (b. 1919)
1971 – Pope Cyril VI of Alexandria, Coptic Orthodox Pope (b. 1902)
1974 – Earl Wilbur Sutherland, Jr., American pharmacologist and biochemist, Nobel Prize laureate (b. 1915)
  1974   – Harry Womack, American singer (b. 1945)
1983 – Faye Emerson, American actress (b. 1917)
  1983   – Ulf von Euler, Swedish physiologist and pharmacologist, Nobel Prize laureate (b. 1905)
1988 – Kurt Georg Kiesinger, German lawyer, politician and Chancellor of Germany (b. 1904)
1989 – Robert Mapplethorpe, American photographer (b. 1946)
1991 – Jim Hardin, American baseball player (b. 1943)
1992 – Menachem Begin, Belarusian-Israeli soldier, politician and Prime Minister of Israel, Nobel Prize laureate (b. 1913)
1993 – C. Northcote Parkinson, English historian and author (b. 1909)
1994 – Charles Bukowski, American poet, novelist, and short story writer (b. 1920)
  1994   – Eddie Creatchman, Canadian wrestler, referee, and manager (b. 1928)
  1994   – Fernando Rey, Spanish actor (b. 1917)
1996 – George Burns, American comedian, actor, and writer (b. 1896)
1997 – Jean-Dominique Bauby, French journalist and author (b. 1952)
  1997   – Terry Nation, Welsh author and screenwriter (b. 1930)
  1997   – The Notorious B.I.G., American rapper, songwriter, and actor (b. 1972)
1999 – Harry Somers, Canadian pianist and composer (b. 1925)
  1999   – George Singh, Belizean jurist and Chief Justice of Belize (b. 1937)
2000 – Jean Coulthard, Canadian composer and educator (b. 1908)
2003 – Stan Brakhage, American director and cinematographer (b. 1933)
  2003   – Bernard Dowiyogo, Nauruan politician, President of Nauru (b. 1946)
2004 – John Mayer, Indian composer (b. 1930)
2006 – Tom Fox, American activist (b. 1951)
  2006   – Anna Moffo, American soprano (b. 1932)
  2006   – John Profumo, English soldier and politician, Secretary of State for War (b. 1915)
2007 – Brad Delp, American singer-songwriter and guitarist (b. 1951)
  2007   – Glen Harmon, Canadian ice hockey player (b. 1921)
2010 – Willie Davis, American baseball player and manager (b. 1940)
  2010   – Doris Haddock, American activist and politician (b. 1910)
  2010   – Wilfy Rebimbus, Indian singer (b. 1942)
2011 – David S. Broder, American journalist and academic (b. 1929)
2013 – Max Jakobson, Finnish journalist and diplomat
  2013   – Merton Simpson, American painter and art collector (b. 1928)
2015 – James Molyneaux, Baron Molyneaux of Killead, Northern Irish soldier and politician (b. 1920)
2016 – Robert Horton, American actor (b. 1924)
  2016   – Clyde Lovellette, American basketball player and coach (b. 1929)
2017 – Howard Hodgkin, British painter (b. 1932)
2018 – Jo Min-ki, Korean actor (b. 1965)
2020 – John Bathersby, Australian Catholic bishop (b. 1936)
2021 – James Levine, American conductor and pianist (b. 1943)
  2021   – Roger Mudd, American journalist (b. 1928)
2023 – Chaim Topol, Israeli actor (b. 1935)

Holidays and observances
Christian feast day:
Catherine of Bologna
Forty Martyrs of Sebaste
Frances of Rome
Pacian
Pope Cyril VI of Alexandria  (Coptic Orthodox Church)
Gregory of Nyssa (Episcopal Church (United States))
 March 9 (Eastern Orthodox liturgics)
Teachers' Day or Eid Al Moalim (Lebanon)

References

Sources

External links

 BBC: On This Day
 
 Historical Events on March 9

Days of the year
March